Sunil Tekchand Wadhwani (born 1952/1953) is an Indian-American businessman, and philanthropist. He is best known as the co-founder (with Ashok Trivedi) of Mastech, Inc. and IGATE. Born in Mumbai, Sunil graduated from the Indian Institute of Technology, Madras, before moving to the United States to earn a degree from Carnegie Mellon University.

Wadhwani is the managing partner at SWAT Capital, and is involved with two philanthropic initiatives, the Wadhwani Institute for Sustainable Healthcare (WISH) and the Wadhwani Institute for Artificial Intelligence (WIAI). He resides in Pittsburgh, Pennsylvania.

Early life and education 
Sunil Wadhwani was born in Mumbai, India, and is the brother of Indian-born American billionaire, Romesh Wadhwani. The Wadhwani family is of Sindhi ancestry.

In 1974, he earned a bachelor's degree in mechanical engineering from IIT Madras, followed by a master's degree in industrial administration from Carnegie Mellon University, Pittsburgh in 1976.

Philanthropy

Wadhwani Initiative for Sustainable Healthcare (WISH) 
Wadhwani established the WISH Foundation in 2014 with the focus to transform the healthcare system of low-income areas in India and other developing countries. The foundation follows a unique Public-Private Partnership (PPP) model.

It works with healthcare innovators, the government, and other private sector partners. WISH currently manages over 200 health centers in India. The model has been implemented in several states in India such as Assam, Rajasthan, and Delhi. Another key initiative by the foundation was to set up Health ATMs, designed to stock medical essentials and important drugs required in rural parts of India.

Wadhwani Institute for Artificial Intelligence (WIAI) 
Around February 2018, Sunil Wadhwani, along with his brother – Romesh Wadhwani, founded the then $30 million philanthropic effort to conduct research in artificial intelligence, machine learning, data sciences, and related areas to address the societal challenges in several domains such as health, agriculture, infrastructure, education, and more.

A day prior its launch, WIAI hosted a summit at IIT Bombay, which brought together 75 AI researchers, government functionaries, and social sector luminaries to identify several issues associated with potential AI solutions around the problems mentioned above.

The WIAI conducts its research in collaboration with the Massachusetts Institute of Technology, Stanford, New York University, University of Southern California, University of Washington, Carnegie Mellon University, IIT Bombay, IIT Delhi, IIT Madras, and the Alan Turing Institute. Indian Prime Minister Narendra Modi is a proponent for the WIAI, having inaugurated the institute.

The Government of Maharashtra, India, signed an MoU (Memorandum of Understanding) with the WIAI, California through the University of Mumbai (MU) to set up a research institute for artificial intelligence in Mumbai.

Business career 
In 1981, he founded UroTec Systems Corp, and served as its President and CEO until 1986. Following his stint with UroTec, he co-founded Mastech Digital Inc., formerly Mastech Inc., serving as its Chairman until September 1996.

By the 2000s, the company had expanded to 34 countries across North America, Europe, and Asia. The Indian sub-continent became the company's largest delivery hub. Under his leadership, IGATE recorded revenues of $1.2 billion and grew to 34,000 employees. The revenue increase and expansion was attributed to the company's acquisition of Patni Computers - a $1 billion deal, helmed by both co-founders - Sunil Wadhwani and Ashok Trivedi.

The company was featured among the five best companies to work at in India. CareerBliss - based on employee happiness and satisfaction quotients - featured IGATE among the twenty-five best companies to work for in the United States of America.

By July 2015, French-IT company, Capgemini completed a $4 billion acquisition of IGATE, recorded as one of the largest deals in the Indian information technology sector. It saw the exit of both Sunil and Ashok Trivedi. Sunil earned $504.2 million from 1,05,06,075 shares.

In 2016, Mastech repositioned itself as a digital technologies company - Mastech Digital, and continues to be listed on the NYSE as MHH. Sunil Wadhwani continues to be part of Mastech Digital's board of directors, and currently serves as the Managing Partner of SWAT Capital.

Personal life 
He is married to Nita. They have a son, Rohan, and a daughter, Shalina.

References 

1950s births
Living people
American people of Indian descent
American people of Sindhi descent
Businesspeople from Mumbai
IIT Madras alumni
Carnegie Mellon University alumni
Businesspeople from Pittsburgh